Lim Seong-Taek (born 19 July 1988) is a South Korean footballer who plays as forward for Suwon FC.

Career
He joined Daegu FC in 2011 but made no appearance in the team. He moved to Korea National League side Chungju Hummel in July.

He signed with Suwon FC in 2012.

References

External links 

1988 births
Living people
Association football forwards
South Korean footballers
Daegu FC players
Chungju Hummel FC players
Suwon FC players
Gimcheon Sangmu FC players
K League 1 players
Korea National League players
K League 2 players
Ajou University alumni